Aftimios Ofiesh, born Abdullah Ofiesh, was an early 20th-century Eastern Orthodox bishop in the United States, serving as the immediate successor to St. Raphael of Brooklyn under the auspices of the Russian Orthodox Church. He held the title Bishop of Brooklyn from 1917 to April 1933, founded and led the American Orthodox Catholic Church for six years, and is, perhaps, best known as being the source of various lines of succession of episcopi vagantes.

Career
Ofiesh, a graduate of the Middle Eastern Orthodox Ecclesiastical Seminary in 1898, assisted Bishop Gabriel Shatilla in Beirut where he was tonsured as a monk, and ordained into the diaconate. After being appointed an archdeacon, Ofiesh unsuccessfully advocated for reform within the Eastern Orthodox Church as he did in seminary. Facing previous threats of excommunication, a few years later, Aftimios lobbied for modernistic reform and was met with further resistance from Patriarch Meletius II of Antioch who threatened excommunication again.

Arriving in New York State in 1905, Aftimios was submitted to the leadership of St. Raphael of Brooklyn. Following the untimely death of St. Raphael of Brooklyn in 1915, then Archimandrite Aftimios Ofiesh was elected to serve as his replacement in caring for the Arab Orthodox faithful in North America under the Russian Orthodox Church's canonical authority. He was consecrated by Archbishop Evdokim Meschersky as an auxiliary bishop in 1917 with the title of Bishop of Brooklyn. In 1923, in recognition for his work in the United States, he was elevated by Metropolitan Platon (Rozhdestvensky) of New York to the rank of archbishop. His elevation to the rank of archbishop was disputed and deemed illicit.

In 1924, in the canonical disputes of American Orthodoxy following the onset of the Bolshevik Revolution in Russia, the Arab Orthodox faithful split into two factions: one that wished to go under the canonical authority of the Greek Orthodox Church of Antioch, and another that wished to stay faithful to the Russian Orthodox Church. The former group was organized by Bishop Victor (Abu Assaly) of New York, thus beginning the official presence of the Greek Orthodox Church of Antioch on American soiltoday, the Antiochian Orthodox Christian Archdiocese of North America.

In 1927, Aftimios was commissioned by the Russian diocese in America to form an English-speaking jurisdiction: the American Orthodox Catholic Church. The purpose of the diocese was to establish a new tradition in North America that was separate from any other particular ethnic or cultural traditions. The diocese in its original form only lasted for six years. During this time, Aftimios consecrated four bishops for his new jurisdiction. Additionally, in 1931, the Society of Clerks Secular of St. Basil, a Western Rite Orthodox group, was established under the auspices of this diocese and subsequently led by Bishop Nichols.

In 1932, Archbishop Aftimios was invited to come to St. Mary's Syrian Orthodox Church in Wilkes-Barre, Pennsylvania, to arbitrate a dispute regarding the transfer of its priest, Fr. Constantine Abou-Adal. When Fr. Constantine left St. Mary's in November 1932, the parish was without a pastor, and so Archbishop Aftimios served in that capacity until February 1933, organizing a choir and Sunday School at the parish. During this time, he met and became involved with one of St. Mary's parishioners, Mariam Namey, then subsequently married her in a civil ceremony in April 1933.

Reports vary at this point as to what happened regarding his episcopacy. According to the parish records of St. Mary's, he "was retired" and lived in nearby Kingston until his death in 1966. With the subsequent withdrawal of support for the American Orthodox Catholic Church, it lost any meaningful chance at resolving its disputed status. According to the book Orthodox Christians in North America (1794–1994), however, Aftimios "resigned his episcopacy and married." A newspaper article states he received a private revelation to abolish clerical celibacy. The biography by Ofiesh's widow Mariam claims that Aftimios fully intended to function as a married bishop, having that intent even before he met Mariam.

Relations between the small jurisdiction created by Aftimios and the mainstream Eastern Orthodox Church were not regularized following his marriage and de facto deposition from the episcopacy. Since that time, numerous and still multiplying lines of succession of episcopi vagantes continue to persist which all trace their roots to Aftimios (mainly through Ignatius Nichols), many of whom regard him as a saint. Some of those bishops are married men, as well, which is a continual stumbling block to their unity with the mainstream Orthodox Church that has, for centuries, maintained a celibate episcopacy.

Following his death in 1966, Aftimios was buried in Maple Hill Cemetery across from St. Mary's Orthodox Cemetery in Wilkes-Barre. His widow, Mariam, subsequently wrote his biography, published in 1999.

Book
The book by Aftimios's widow, while including a great deal of historical information, is not mainly a scholarly work but is, rather, a biography aimed toward the exoneration of her late husband. One of its primary themes throughout is that Aftimios's marriage to Mariam was justified and that the canonical tradition of celibacy for Orthodox bishops is "man-made" and should be abolished.

Writings

Claimed successors
Various independent sacramental jurisdictions have claimed apostolic succession through Aftimios Ofiesh. Most of the groups have merged or disbanded. Notable continuations include the American Orthodox Catholic Church (American Orthodox Patriarchate), Byleorussian Orthodox Catholic Church (today the American World Patriarchs), and the American Orthodox Church established in 1972 by Bishop Joseph Thaddeus (Alan Sanford).

See also 
American Orthodox Catholic Church
Episcopi vagantes

Notes

References

Further reading

 
 
 
 

1880 births
1966 deaths
20th-century Eastern Orthodox bishops
American people of Lebanese descent
Burials in Pennsylvania
Eastern Orthodox bishops in the United States